Bactra copidotes is a moth of the family Tortricidae first described by Edward Meyrick in 1909. It is found in India and Sri Lanka.

References

Moths of Asia
Moths described in 1909